John  Cook (1770 (sic)–1824) was a Scottish minister, historian and amateur artist. He was a pioneer in the field of Biblical Criticism.

Life

He was born on November 24, 1770 in St Andrews the first son of John Cook and his wife, Janet Hill, sister of George Hill. He was the first of 12 children. His birthdate is sometimes shown in records as 1771 to disguise his birth being less than 9 months after his parents marriage.

He studied Divinity at St Andrews University under his father and was licensed to preach by the Church of Scotland. In 1793 he became minister of Kilmany.

A technically skilled album of his drawings (mainly townscapes in St Andrews) from 1797 are in the possession of the University of St Andrews.
In 1802 he was appointed Professor of Hebrew at St Andrews University. He was later given the first university Chair in Biblical Criticism (1808-1824)

He died in St Andrews on 28 November 1824 aged 54.

Family
He married his cousin, Elisabeth Hill, daughter of George Hill. They had at least seven children.
He was father to John Cook (1807-1869) who in turn was father to Rachel Cook.

His brother was George Cook.

He  married  2  July  1803, Elizabeth  (died  12  September  1848),  daughter  of George  Hill,  D.D.,  Principal  of  St  Mary's 
College,  and  had  issue — 
Harriet,  died  1805
Alexander,  born  1804,  died  1839
Janet, born  11  January  1806,  died  20  May  1842
John,  D.D.,  professor  of  Church  History,  St Andrews,  born  1  September  1807
George,  minister of  Kincardine  O'Neil,  born  27  March  1809
Elizabeth,  born  15  August  1812,  died  at  Rome 1878
Walter,  lieut.  Madras  Infantry,  born 19  January  1815,  died  1838
Alexander,  born 1  May  1821.

Publications
An Inquiry into the Books of the New Testament (Edinburgh,  1821)
An Album of Watercolours of St Andrews  (1797)

References

Citations

Sources

1770 births
1824 deaths
19th-century Ministers of the Church of Scotland
Academics of the University of St Andrews
Alumni of the University of St Andrews
18th-century Ministers of the Church of Scotland